Pals and Gals is a 1954 short subject directed by Jules White starring American slapstick comedy team The Three Stooges (Moe Howard, Larry Fine and Shemp Howard). It is the 155th entry in the series released by Columbia Pictures starring the comedians, who released 190 shorts for the studio between 1934 and 1959.

Plot
Shemp is suffering from an enlarged vein in his leg, and fears that it will lead to amputation. His doctor (Vernon Dent), however, advises that a few weeks in the Old West will cure him. Upon arrival in a somewhat lawless town, the boys befriend the ruthless Doc Barker (Norman Willes). Barker listens to Shemp's story about his bad leg, mistaking "the biggest vein you ever saw" for a gold-bearing vein worth millions. The Stooges take a liking to Barker, but are later informed by the beautiful Nell (Christine McIntyre) that he is an outlaw who is holding her two sisters (Norma Randall and Ruth White) hostage in the basement of the saloon.

The boys hatch a plan to obtain the prison cell keys from Barker's coat. Shemp joins the outlaw in a game of poker, while Moe and Larry prepare beverages for the card players. The two find every possible deadly chemical they can to add to their volatile Mickey Finn, from Old Homicide to paint (plus paint remover). They also prepare a sarsaparilla for Shemp to make sure their pal does not indulge in the suicidal drink. Barker downs the concoction, and screams for water. Shemp grabs a nearby fire hose and sprays the entire gang, soaking them. Moe and Larry quickly grab Barker's coat (claiming he will catch pneumonia) and get the cell keys to Nell, who frees her sisters. Barker ends up dying of heart failure at the Poker table, and his irate gang throw Larry in the cell with plans to kill him at sunrise.

Moe and Shemp attempt to free Larry using every tool they can find, while the girls ride for help. After freeing Larry, the trio stumble upon a suitcase full of old, Southern-style clothing. They then quickly change outfits to disguise themselves from Barker's gang, but a gang member (Stanley Blystone) recognizes them. The boys flee the saloon, and scurry away to hideout outside of town. Just as they are cornered by Barker's gang, Shemp takes off his gun belt, and, now serving as an ad hoc ammunition belt, puts it through a meat grinder. The increased firepower scares the gang away, and the Stooges emerge victorious.

Cast

Credited

Production notes
Pals and Gals is a reworking of 1947's Out West, using ample stock footage. In addition, scenes of the Stooges escaping the saloon via horseback were recycled from 1937's Goofs and Saddles. Insert shots needed to bridge old footage were filmed on April 28, 1953.

In order to advance the new plot and connect recycled scenes, the character of Doc Barker is killed off by dying of heart failure after consuming Moe's Mickey Finn. Due to careless editing of stock footage, Barker accidentally reappears a few moments later while Nell is singing in the bar. So that the pre-chase scenes would match up with the chase from Goofs and Saddles, Stanley Blystone, who had played the antagonist Longhorn Pete in Goofs and Saddles, was asked to don a costume to portray one of the gang members in Pals and Gals; That way there would not be such a blatant mismatch when Blystone is seen (via old footage) yelling from the window after the Stooges jump into the wagon and flee. Blystone had appeared as a United States Cavalry Colonel in Out West, a plot device not carried over to Pals and Gals. Director Jules White, a previous film editor, often took great care in making such matches; he used a moviola on the set to make sure new footage matched old.

Pals and Gals marks the final appearance of longtime supporting actor Blackie Whiteford.  This was his final appearance in a short film. This was also the last film of George Chesebro who retired the same year.

References

External links 
 
 
Pals and Gals at threestooges.net

1954 films
1954 short films
1950s Western (genre) comedy films
The Three Stooges films
American black-and-white films
The Three Stooges film remakes
Films directed by Jules White
Columbia Pictures short films
1954 comedy films
American comedy short films
1950s English-language films
1950s American films